The following railroads operate in the U.S. state of Nebraska.

Common freight carriers

BNSF Railway (BNSF)
Canadian National Railway (CN) through subsidiary Chicago Central and Pacific Railroad (CC)
Canadian Pacific Railway (CP) through subsidiary Dakota, Minnesota and Eastern Railroad (DME)
Kansas City Southern Railway (KCS)
Manning Rail (MANR)
Nebraska Central Railroad (NCRC)
Nebraska Kansas Colorado Railway (NKCR)
Nebraska Northwestern Railroad (NNW)
Omaha, Lincoln and Beatrice Railway (OLB)
Rapid City, Pierre and Eastern Railroad (RCPE)
Sidney and Lowe Railroad (SLGG)
Union Pacific Railroad (UP)

Passenger carriers

Amtrak (AMTK)
Fremont and Elkhorn Valley Railroad
Omaha Zoo Railroad

Defunct railroads

Not completed
Atkinson and Northern Railroad

Notes

References
Association of American Railroads (2003), Railroad Service in Nebraska (PDF). Retrieved May 11, 2005.

Nebraska
 
 
Railroads